Church Fenton railway station serves Church Fenton in North Yorkshire, England. It is on the former York and North Midland Railway main line from York to Normanton, just under  from York.

History

The Y&NMR opened the first part of its route through the village (and on as far as Milford) on 29 May 1839, completing it the following year.  On completion of a branch from there to Harrogate via Wetherby and Tadcaster by the Y&NM in 1848 a new station on a slightly different site gave it new importance and within two years it had become a calling point on the new East Coast Main Line (ECML) from York to London with the opening of a line from Burton Salmon to Knottingley (trains then continuing via Askern and Doncaster).

Further development of the station occurred in 1869, when a  link was opened by the North Eastern Railway from there to Micklefield on the former Leeds & Selby Railway to create a new main line between Leeds and York. The NER had been looking to shorten the previous, indirect route between the two cities via Castleford for some time prior to this, but plans to build a line via Tadcaster had come to nothing and so this alternative route was chosen. The existing line from here to York was subsequently quadrupled to handle the increased levels of traffic and the station substantially altered, with the addition of extra platforms and connections between the two pairs of lines.  The station lost its ECML status in 1871 when the new direct line from York to Doncaster via Selby was opened, but trains from London to Harrogate continued to call and yet another addition to the list of routes serving the station came in 1879 when the Swinton and Knottingley Joint Railway line via Pontefract Baghill and Ferrybridge was opened. In connection with the quadrupling of the lines the present station was opened in 1904 slightly south of the second station.

Today the station remains busy, even though the Harrogate line fell victim to the Beeching cuts in January 1964 and passenger trains towards Castleford ended six years later. The Leeds to York Line carries a frequent passenger service (including CrossCountry and TransPennine Express services) whilst the line towards Sherburn, Milford Junction and thence to Knottingley, Castleford and Pontefract carries large quantities of freight. Northern operates all services that call on the Leeds to York, Dearne Valley and Hull to York routes that run through the four operational platforms (a fifth on the western side, once used for Harrogate trains, is disused).

The station is covered by a long-line automatic P.A system to provide real-time train running details.  Passenger information screens are also installed and there is a ticket machine available for passengers to buy tickets (card only) or a permit to travel (for cash fares).  Access to all four platforms is via footbridge, so there is no step-free access to any of the platforms.  The former booking office at street level is now in private commercial use as a restaurant, but the platform level buildings were all demolished by 1990.

Services

The service levels at the station were increased significantly at the summer 2018 timetable change and modified again in December 2018 - trains on the York to Leeds line now call hourly each way throughout the day, whilst many York to Hull and  trains also stop (previously only a limited peak service was provided on this route).  Most Leeds-bound services normally continue through to  via Bradford Interchange and run express to Leeds.  A limited service (three per day) is also provided to  via the Dearne Valley line.

Sundays now also see an hourly service to Leeds and York, plus two trains to and from Sheffield and three to Hull.  Most Leeds services continue to Blackpool North.

Upgrade and electrification
The Transpennine Route Upgrade includes electrification from Manchester to York through Church Fenton. In May 2021 it was confirmed that electrification of the line had been approved along with other improvements. The Integrated Rail Plan for the North and Midlands published in November 2021 further confirmed this upgrade.(IRP)

References and notes

Body, G. (1988), PSL Field Guides - Railways of the Eastern Region Volume 2, Patrick Stephens Ltd, Wellingborough,

External links

Railway stations in North Yorkshire
DfT Category F2 stations
Railway stations in Great Britain opened in 1839
Northern franchise railway stations
Former York and North Midland Railway stations